Dream a New Dream is the debut single album of Taiwanese Mandopop artist Selina Jen, of girl group S.H.E. It was released on 16 December 2011 by HIM International Music and contains three tracks. The EP comes with a bonus DVD containing 2 music videos and making-of, and a set of 7 postcards.

Track listing

Bonus DVD
To My Dear… From Selina
"Everyone Who Loves Me" MV
"Dream" MV
"Everyone Who Loves Me" MV behind the scenes

Music videos

References

Selina Jen albums
2011 EPs
HIM International Music albums